Framed is a British television crime drama series, created and written by acclaimed author Lynda La Plante, adapted from her novel of the same name. The four-part series, broadcast on ITV, ran from 27 November to 18 December 1992 and followed police officer Lawrence Jackson (David Morrissey), who whilst on holiday in Spain, bumps into career criminal Eddie Myers (Timothy Dalton), who was known to have been involved a bank robbery committed several years ago, but was never caught. The officer who investigated the original case, Jimmy McKinnes (Timothy West) assigns Jackson to go undercover and live with Myers in an attempt to finally bring him to justice.

Annabelle Apsion co-stars as Susan Jackson, Larry's long-suffering wife who has an affair whilst Larry is working on the case, and Penélope Cruz stars as Lola Del Moreno, one of Myers' girls who has been protecting him during his time living in Spain. For its broadcast in the United States, the series was edited down into one, feature-length special, of just 120 minutes long. It removed most of the first episode, which was filmed in Spain, and various scenes of Morrissey and Apsion from the other episodes. The series was remade in the United States in 2002, starring Rob Lowe and Sam Neill in the title roles.

The series was produced by Anglia Television, in association with A&E Network Television and Tesauro Productions. The complete series was released on DVD on 16 January 2006.

Characters
 Timothy Dalton as Eddie Myers
 Timothy West as D.C.I. Jimmy McKinnes
 David Morrissey as D.C. Lawrence 'Larry' Jackson
 Annabelle Apsion as Susan Jackson
 Penélope Cruz as Lola Del Moreno
 Trevor Cooper as D.I. Frank Shrapnel
 James Findleton as Tony Jackson
 Barry Findleton as John Jackson 
 Rowena King as Charlotte Lampton
 Sheila White as Moyra Sheffield 
 Glyn Grimstead as D.I. Jimmy Falcon 
 Anthony Smee as Superintendent Glycin
 Wayne Foskett	as D.C. Summers 
 Francis Johnson as D.C. Frisby 
 Carol Holt as Nurse Jackie

Episodes

References

External links

1992 British television series debuts
1992 British television series endings
1990s British drama television series
1990s British crime television series
ITV television dramas
1990s British television miniseries
Television series by ITV Studios
Television series produced at Pinewood Studios
English-language television shows
Spanish-language television shows
Television shows set in the United Kingdom
Television shows set in Spain
Television shows produced by Anglia Television